UAG may stand for:

Biology
 In biology, the "amber" stop codon UAG; see genetic code

Education
 Universidad Autónoma de Guadalajara, the first private university and host to a large medical school in Mexico.
 University of Arkansas Grantham

Sports
 The African Gymnastics Union (French: l'Union Africaine de Gymnastique)
 Estudiantes Tecos, a Mexican professional football (soccer) club, previously associated with the Universidad Autónoma de Guadalajara, and as Tecos UAG

Technology
 Microsoft Forefront Unified Access Gateway, Microsoft solution for remote access to corporate applications
 VMware Unified Access Gateway

Transportation
 Afra Airlines (ICAO code UAG), an airline in Ghana
 United Auto Group, an American automotive retailer

Video games
 UAG, a video game also known as Thundercade